Tillery may refer to:

People with the surname
Dwight Tillery, American politician who served as mayor Cincinnati from 1991 to 1993
Elijah Tillery (born 1957), American boxer
Gary Tillery (born 1947), American author
Jerry Tillery (born 1996), American football player
Ken Tillery, American murder victim
Linda Tillery (born 1948), American singer

Locations
Tillery, North Carolina
Tillery-Fries House, historic house in North Carolina, USA
George W. Tillery House, historic house in Tennessee, USA
Virginia Tillery Round Barn, historic house in Illinois, USA
Lake Tillery, a lake in North Carolina, USA